Kviteseid is a municipality in Telemark in the county of Vestfold og Telemark in Norway. It is part of the traditional region of Upper Telemark and Vest-Telemark. The administrative centre of the municipality is the village of Kviteseid. The parish of Hvideseid was established as a municipality on 1 January 1838 (see formannskapsdistrikt). Kviteseid Seminar was the first public school which started in 1819 and was in operation until 1889. Kviteseid Library (Kviteseid Folkebibliotek) was founded in 1895. The library was first based on a book collection from Kviteseid Seminar.

The main industries of the municipality are forestry, agriculture, tourism, and hydroelectric power.  The Telemark Canal goes through Kviteseid.  There are also several ski resorts in Kviteseid. Vrådal is one of them.

Within the municipality of Kviteseid, one finds the little village of Morgedal, also known as the "Cradle of Modern Skiing" ("Skisportens vugge") and home of Sondre Norheim. Here, the Olympic Flame was lit for the 1952 Winter Olympics in Oslo, 1960 Winter Olympics in Squaw Valley, and 1994 Winter Olympics in Lillehammer.

General information

Name
The Old Norse form of the name was Hvítiseið. The first element is the genitive case of Hvítir which means "the white one" (probably an older name of Kviteseidvatn) and the last element is eið which means "path between two lakes".  Prior to 1889, the name was written "Hviteseid".

Coat-of-arms
The coat-of-arms is from modern times.  They were granted in 1987. The arms show an old black-colored lock on a gold/yellow background.  It was chosen to symbolize safety.

Geography
The municipality borders Seljord to the northwest; Nome to the east; Drangedal, Nissedal, and Fyresdal to the south; and Tokke to the west. The small parish of Åsgrend is within the boundaries of Kviteseid.

Notable people 

 Peter Paulson Paus (1590 - 1653 in Kviteseid) a high-ranking cleric, provost of Upper Telemark 1633-1653
 Knut Mevasstaul (1785 in Kviteseid – 1862) a Norwegian rose painter
 Sondre Norheim (1825 in Morgedal – 1897) a pioneer skier and father of Telemark skiing
 brothers Torjus Hemmestveit (1860–1930) & Mikkjel Hemmestveit (1863–1957) born in Morgedal, Norwegian-American Nordic skiers, shared the Holmenkollen medal in 1928
 Olav Bjaaland (1873 in Morgedal – 1961) a Norwegian ski champion and polar explorer, one of the five men to reach the South Pole as part of Amundsen's South Pole expedition in 1911
 Einar Landvik (1898 in Kviteseid – 1993) a Nordic skier, competed in 1924 Winter Olympics 
 Dyre Vaa (1903 in Kviteseid – 1980) a Norwegian sculptor and painter
 Solveig Muren Sanden (1918 in Vrådal – 2013) a Norwegian illustrator and comics artist

References

External links
 
 
 Municipal fact sheet from Statistics Norway
 
 Fjaagesund.no

 
Municipalities of Vestfold og Telemark
Villages in Vestfold og Telemark